Brian Leopoldo  Brivati is a British historian. He was a professor of contemporary history at Kingston University and worked as a director of the John Smith memorial trust from 2008 to 2012.

His work has appeared in The Guardian, The Times, the Financial Times, The Independent on Sunday, The Observer, New Statesman, Progress, the Fabian Review and Parliamentary Brief. Brivati has appeared as a political commentator on BBC Radio 4.

Brivati is a specialist in designing and delivering professional development, leadership and bespoke training programmes for government, NGOS, the private sector and overseas clients. He also works as a special adviser to politicians, government departments and civil society organisations in Central and Eastern Europe, Iraq and other Middle East countries.

Brivati's academic career evolved from public policy, political history and biography into the teaching of Human Rights. His research interests are focussed on the interface between human rights and cyber security, the evolving nature of conflict, and the place of genocide and crimes against humanity in contemporary politics. Before joining PGI, he was Professor of Human Rights and Life Writing at Kingston University and is still a visiting Lecturer there.

He is academic director of the PGI Cyber Academy and an adviser to Cleave and Co, and co-chair of the Kurdish Genocide UK advisory council. He also sits on the editorial boards of Total Politics and the IPPR Journal. Brivati is a frequent contributor to print and broadcast media and a keynote and guest lecturer on a range of topics in the UK and abroad.

Brivati is a director of The Stabilisation and Recovery Network.

Works

References

Year of birth missing (living people)
Living people
Academics of Kingston University
British historians
British biographers
British political journalists
Labor historians